Mustafa Said (مصطفى سعيد) is an Egyptian singer, musicologist, composer and a virtuoso Oud player. He has been living in Beirut since 2004. He is one of the few young talents to devote his career to the classical Arabic repertoire while exploring new forms and new sounds.

Former professor at the House of Oud (Cairo), he extends his musical approach from the already existent musical traditions of the east Mediterranean region with the spirit of the two previous musical renaissances: that of the golden age of Abbasid music, and that of the second half of the 19th century. Inspired by the oriental traditional heritage, the compositions and forms of interpretation of Mustafa Said offer a very contemporary approach and place great emphasis on the instrumental and vocal improvisation (Taqsim).

Said has composed music for several documentaries and drama and participated in many local and international festivals as a solo performer or as part of an ensemble: Institute of the Arab World (2007), Mugam Festival in Azerbaijan (2009), Songs of Peace and Réconciliation conference in Indonesia (2009), Sounds of Arabia Festival in Abu Dhabi (2010), toured in Japan where he performed 17 concerts and conferences (2010), Fes Festival of World Sacred Music (2010). Mustafa Saïd is also the founder of the Asil Oriental Ensemble and is a lecturer in traditional Arabic ensemble music at the Higher Institute of Music, Antonine University (Lebanon) since 2006.

Discography 
Albums
 Rubaiyat El Khayyam (2008)
 Asil (2010)

Contributing artist
 The Rough Guide To Arabic Revolution (2013)

References

      .

Egyptian musicians
Living people
Year of birth missing (living people)